The 1920–21 Washington Huskies men's basketball team represented the University of Washington for the  college basketball season. Led by first-year head coach Hec Edmundson, the Huskies were members of the Pacific Coast Conference and played their home games on campus in Seattle, Washington.

Washington ended the season with eight consecutive wins, six in conference.

Edmundson joined the UW athletic staff in 1920 as track coach, and also led the Husky basketball program for 27 years; he continued as track coach for seven more, retiring in the summer of 1954. A native of Moscow, Idaho, (and an Olympian in track in 1912) he had previously coached basketball for two seasons in his hometown at his alma mater, Idaho.

References

External links
Sports Reference – Washington Huskies: 1920–21 basketball season
Washington Huskies men's basketball media guide (2009–10) – History

Washington Huskies men's basketball seasons
Washington Huskies
Washington
Washington